Florid may refer to:

 Florid, Illinois, US, an unincorporated community
 Great Wall Florid, a car

See also
 Florid cutaneous papillomatosis, a paraneoplastic syndrome
 Florid music or coloratura, elaborate melody in operatic singing